Pachni is a settlement in the Xanthi regional unit of Greece, part of the municipal unit Kotyli. Greek foreign affairs minister Dora Bakoyannis visited the village during her tour of Thrace.

References

Populated places in Xanthi (regional unit)